"Redemption" is a song by Nigerian rapper and record producer Jesse Jagz. It was released as the lead single from his second studio album Jagz Nation, Vol.1. Thy Nation Come (2013). The song was written and produced by Jesse Jagz and is the first single released by the rapper after his exit from Chocolate City.

Music video
The music video for "Redemption" was shot by MEX films at Samklef's studio in Lagos. It was uploaded to YouTube on May 29, 2013, at a total length of 4 minutes and 24 seconds.

Critical reception
"Redemption" received positive reviews from music critics. Ovie O of NotJustOk commended Jesse Jagz for "delivering conscious dancehall music" and stated that the rapper was inspired by other Jamaican acts. A writer for OkayAfrica said the song is "anchored on an addictive clink-clank beat and swerving synth melody, which Jesse Jagz expertly rides and molds into a hip-hop-meets-dancehall gem." Alex Amos of Onobello considers Jesse Jagz to be "the truth" and said the record "expresses his confidence in the path that he has chosen." A writer for Pulse Nigeria commended Jesse Jagz's rastafarian delivery and said he started his imprint in style.

Track listing
 Digital single

Release history

References

2013 songs
2013 singles
Jesse Jagz songs
Reggae songs
Song recordings produced by Jesse Jagz